Diazinanes, Hexahydrodiazines  are a class of nitrogen-containing heterocycles consisting of a saturated four-carbon/two-nitrogen ring. They exist in three isomeric forms depending on the relative position of the two nitrogen atoms, with 1,4-diazinanes being common.

Structure 
The diazinanes have six-membered cyclohexane-like ring but with two carbons replaced by nitrogens. The three isomers of triazinane are distinguished by the positions of their nitrogen atoms, and are referred to as 1,2-diazinane, 1,3-diazinane, and 1,4-diazinane (more commonly called piperazine).

References 

 Heterocyclic Chemistry T.L. Gilchrist 1985  (1997)

See also

 6-membered saturated rings with one nitrogen atom: Piperidine
 6-membered saturated rings with two nitrogen atoms: Diazinane
 Piperazine
 Hexahydropyrimidine
 Hexahydropyridazine
 6-membered aromatic rings with two nitrogen atoms: Diazine
 Pyrazine
 pyrimidine
 pyridazine
 6-membered saturated rings with three nitrogen atoms Triazinane
 Hexahydro-1,3,5-triazine

Heterocyclic compounds with 1 ring
Nitrogen heterocycles
Six-membered rings
Diamines
Diazinanes